The Mexican International Conference on Artificial Intelligence (MICAI) is the name of an annual conference covering all areas of Artificial Intelligence (AI), held in Mexico. The first MICAI conference was held in 2000. The conference is attended every year by about two hundred of AI researchers and PhD students and 500−1000 local graduate students.

Overview 
MICAI is a high-level peer-reviewed international conference covering all areas of Artificial Intelligence. All editions of MICAI have been published in Springer Springer LNAI (N 1793, 2313, 2972, 3789, 4293, 4827, 5317, 5845, 6437–6438). Recent MICAI events (2006, 2007, 2008, 2009, and 2010) received over 300 submissions from over 40 countries each. The conference's scientific program includes keynote lectures, paper presentations, tutorials, panels, posters, and workshops. MICAI is organized by the Mexican Society for Artificial Intelligence (SMIA) in cooperation with various national institutions.

Their topics of interest include, but are not limited to:
Applications of artificial intelligence,
Automated theorem proving,
Belief revision,
Bioinformatics and Medical applications of artificial intelligence,
Case-based reasoning,
Common-sense reasoning,
Computer vision and image processing,
Constraint programming,
Data mining,
Expert systems and knowledge-based systems,
Fuzzy logic,
Genetic algorithms,
Hybrid intelligent systems,
Intelligent interfaces: multimedia, virtual reality,
Intelligent organizations,
Intelligent tutoring systems,
Knowledge acquisition,
Knowledge representation and knowledge management,
Logic programming,
Machine learning,
Model-based reasoning,
Multiagent systems and distributed artificial intelligence,
Natural Language Processing,
Neural Networks,
Non-monotonic Reasoning,
Ontologies,
Pattern Recognition,
Philosophical and methodological issues of artificial intelligence,
Planning and scheduling,
Qualitative reasoning,
Robotics,
Spatial and temporal reasoning,
Uncertainty reasoning and probabilistic reasoning.

Specific MICAI conferences 
In the table below, the figures for the number of accepted papers and acceptance rate refer to the main proceedings volume and do not include supplemental proceedings volumes. The number of countries corresponds to submissions, not to accepted papers.

Keynote speakers and program chairs 
The following persons were honored by being selected by the organizers as keynote speakers or program chairs:

Awards 
The authors of the following papers received the Best Paper Award:

See also 
 The list of computer science conferences contains other academic conferences in computer science.

References

External links 
 MICAI series website
 Mexican Society for Artificial Intelligence (SMIA)

Computer science conferences
Academic conferences
Artificial intelligence conferences
Recurring events established in 2000
Annual events in Mexico
International conferences in Mexico